The 1954–55 Norwegian 1. Divisjon season was the 16th season of ice hockey in Norway. Seven teams participated in the league, and Gamlebyen won the championship.

Regular season

External links 
 Season on eliteprospects.com

Nor
GET-ligaen seasons
1954 in Norwegian sport
1955 in Norwegian sport